Events from the year 1653 in art.

Events
Architect and painter Lambert van Haven begins a 16-year period of travelling in Europe.
Construction of the Taj Mahal mausoleum at Agra in India is completed, probably to a design by Ustad Ahmad Lahauri, together with the Moti Masjid (Pearl Mosque) in Agra Fort.

Works

Paintings
Guercino - The Martyrdom of Saint Catherine
Claude Lorrain - The Adoration of the Golden Calf
Nicolaes Maes - Abraham Dismissing Hagar and Ishmael
Rembrandt van Rijn - Aristotle Contemplating a Bust of Homer
Diego Velázquez
Portrait of the Infanta Maria Theresa of Spain
Portrait of Mariana of Austria (original version, Museo del Prado, 1652–53)
Jan van Kessel - series of insects and fruit

Sculpture
 Alessandro Algardi - Fuga d'Attila relief (St. Peter's Basilica, Rome)

Births
January - Nicolas Fouché, French painter (died 1733)
January 23 - Giovanni Girolamo Bonesi, Italian painter (died 1725)
February 1 - Felix Meyer, Swiss painter and engraver (died 1713)
May 13 - Giuseppe Maria Mazza, Bolognese Rococo sculptor (died 1741)
October 20 - Charles-François Poerson, French painter (died 1725)
December 21 - Tommaso Aldrovandini, Italian painter (died 1736)
date unknown
Sébastien Barras, French painter and engraver (died 1703)
Carel de Vogelaer, Dutch still life painter (died 1695)
Jacques-Philippe Ferrand, French miniaturist and painter in enamel (died 1732)
Marcellus Laroon, Dutch painter and engraver,  active in England (died 1702)
Angelo Massarotti, Italian painter active in his native Cremona (died 1723)
Kanō Tanshin, Japanese painter (died 1718)
Sante Vandi, Italian portrait painter (died 1716)
probable
Bonaventura Lamberti, Italian painter, active mainly in Rome (died 1721)
Gaspar van Wittel, Dutch landscape painter (died 1736)

Deaths
March - Simon de Vlieger, Dutch painter (b. 1601)
August 16 - Giuliano Finelli, Italian sculptor (b. 1601)
August 24 - Henry Stone, English painter (b. 1616)
August 29 - Gijsbert d'Hondecoeter, Dutch landscape and animal painter (b. 1604)
October 16 - Jan Wildens, Flemish Baroque painter and draughtsman specializing in landscapes (b. 1595/1596)
October 22 - Thomas de Critz, English painter (b. 1607)
date unknown
Antoon Faydherbe, Dutch sculptor (date of birth unknown)
Aletta Hanemans, model for Frans Hals (b. 1606)
probable
(d. 1653/1665) - Astolfo Petrazzi, Italian painter, active mainly in his native Siena (b. 1583)
(d. 1653/1656) - Nicolaes Pickenoy, Dutch painter of Flemish origin (b. 1588)

References

 
Years of the 17th century in art
1650s in art